Taleb Tawatha (or Twatha, ; born ) is an Israeli professional footballer who plays as a defender for Israeli Premier League club Bnei Sakhnin and the Israel national football team.

Tawatha started his career at Maccabi Haifa, where he won Israeli Premier League title in 2011 and the Israel State Cup in 2016. He became an integral part of the club's defence, making 204 appearances over the course of seven seasons. In July 2016, Tawatha signed for German club Eintracht Frankfurt of the Bundesliga for a transfer fee of €1.5 million, and was part of the team that won the DFB-Pokal in 2018. In August 2019, he was released and two weeks later signed as a free agent with Bulgarian club Ludogorets Razgrad.

A youth international for Israel from under-16 to under-21 level, Tawatha made his senior debut in 2011.

Early life
Tawatha was born in Jisr az-Zarqa, Israel, to an Arab-Muslim family of Sudanese and Bedouin descent.

He also holds Sudanese citizenship.

Career

Maccabi Haifa
Tawatha  trained in the youth teams of Maccabi Haifa. In 2009 he made his debut appearance in the senior team. His break-through season was 2010/2011 in which he helped Maccabi Haifa to win the Israeli Premier League championship, scored one goal and assisted five from his position as a left defender. Tawatha won the "Young Discovery Award" and was included in the MVP team of the season. In 2016 he won the Israeli State Cup with Maccabi Haifa.

Eintracht Frankfurt
In July 2016, Tawatha was signed by German club Eintracht Frankfurt for a transfer fee of 1.5 million Euros. On 19 May 2018, he won the DFB-Pokal with Eintracht Frankfurt after they defeated Bayern Munich 3–1 in the final.

Ludogorets Razgrad
On 11 September 2019, Tawatha joined Bulgarian First League side Ludogorets Razgrad as a free agent.

Career statistics

(correct as of 1 June 2022)

International goals
Scores and results list Israel's goal tally first.

Honours
Maccabi Haifa
 Israeli Premier League: 2010–11, 2020–21, 2021–22
 Israel State Cup: 2015–16
 Toto Cup: 2021–22
 Israel Super Cup: 2021

Eintracht Frankfurt
DFB-Pokal: 2017–18; runner-up: 2016–17

Ludogorets Razgrad
Bulgarian First League: 2019–20

References

External links

Taleb Tawatha at Soccerway 
Taleb Tawatha at Maccabi Haifa Profile
Taleb Tawatha at IFA National Profile

1992 births
Living people
Israeli footballers
Footballers from Haifa District
Arab-Israeli footballers
Arab citizens of Israel
Sudanese footballers
Bedouin Israelis
Israeli Muslims
Maccabi Haifa F.C. players
Eintracht Frankfurt players
PFC Ludogorets Razgrad players
Bnei Sakhnin F.C. players
Israeli Premier League players
Bundesliga players
First Professional Football League (Bulgaria) players
Israel international footballers
Israeli expatriate footballers
Expatriate footballers in Germany
Expatriate footballers in Bulgaria
Israeli expatriate sportspeople in Germany
Israeli expatriate sportspeople in Bulgaria
Israel youth international footballers
Israel under-21 international footballers
Israeli people of Sudanese descent
Association football defenders